Fotö is an island and a locality in Öckerö Municipality, Västra Götaland County, Sweden with 620 inhabitants in 2010. It is connected to the island of Hönö with bridge.

References 

Populated places in Västra Götaland County
Populated places in Öckerö Municipality